Orange liqueur is a liqueur produced from oranges.  Orange liqueurs include:
 Triple sec
 Grand Marnier